Gjermund Larsen (born 29 July 1981 in Verdal, Norway) is a Norwegian traditional folk musician (violin) and composer, known from several bands and recordings.

Career 
Larsen is a trained musician from the Ole Bull Academy at Voss, and the traditional folk music program at the Norwegian Academy of Music in Oslo. During his studies he joined the band Majorstuen, and contributed on several album releases, including Majorstuen awarded Spellemannprisen 2003. He collaborated within the Finnish-Norwegian band Frigg, Christian Wallumrød Sexstet, and with Odd Nordstoga and Maj Britt Andersen, as well as with the blues artist Reidar Larsen (2006).

Larsen is the son of Norwegian the traditional folk singer Geir Egil Larsen, and was the youngest winner in the A-class aton 'Landskappleiken' (2002), where he and his brother Einar Olav Larsen was awarded a number of ensemble prizes. Sibling duo released the album Søttenpassingen (2004) with several compositions by Hilmar Alexandersen, and was awarded the Osaprisen (2004). While he received Øyvind Bergh's Memorial Prize himself. For the Vossajazz he contributed on the commission Ein engel går stilt by Berit Opheim (2007), also performed with Rikskonsertene.

Larsen debuted with the work Brytningstid for the 'Telemarkfestivalen' (2006). In 2006 he started the Gjermund Larsen Trio with Andreas Utnem (pedal organ) and Sondre Meisfjord (upright bass. They released the album Ankomst (2008), awarded the Spellemannprisen class traditional folk music/folk dancing. In 2010 they released the follow up album Aurum.

In 2009 he released his first album with music for children, Går i fjøs, together with 'Bom Basker'. On the album presented traditional children's songs in a new guise. The album was nominated for Spellemannprisen 2009 in the class klassen music for children, at the same time as Larsen was nominated in the contemporary composer category for Grains. He was nominated for two again awards again in 2010 in the class traditional folk music/folk dance with Gjermund Larsen Trio, and the class popular composer, both for the album Aurum.

Honors 
2003: Spellemannprisen in the class traditional folk music/folk dance, within the band Majorstuen for the album Majorstuen
2008: Spellemannprisen in the class traditional folk music/folk dance, for the album Ankomst

Discography

Solo albums 
2004: Søttenpassingen (ta-lik), with Einar Olav Larsen
2008: Ankomst (Heilo)
2009: Går I Fjøs (Øra Fonogram), with 'Bom Basker' doing music for children
2010: Aurum (Heilo)
2013: Reise (Heilo), as Gjermund Larsen Trio
2014: Trønderbarokk (Øra Fonogram)
2016: Salmeklang (Heilo), as Gjermund Larsen Trio including Sondre Meisfjord (upright bass) and Andreas Utnem (grand piano), fetat. Nordic

Collaborations 
Within 'Majorstuen'
2002: Majorstuen (2L)
2004: Jorun Jogga (Majorstuen Fiddlers Company)
2006: Juledrøm (Majorstuen Fiddlers Company)
2010: Skir (Majorstuen Fiddlers Company)
2011: White Night - Impressions of Norwegian Folk Music (Majorstuen Fiddlers Company)
2012: Live In Concert (Majorstuen Fiddlers Company)

With Maria Arredondo
2005: Min Jul (Universal Music)

With Christian Wallumrød Ensemble
2009: Fabula Suite Lugano (ECM Records)

With Christel Alsos
2010: Tomorrow Is (Sony Music)

With Moddi
2013: Kæm va du? (Propeller Recordings)
2013: Grønt Lauv I Snyen (Propeller Recordings)

With Arve Henriksen
2014: The Nature Of Connections (Rune Grammofon)

References

External links 

Norwegian violinists
Male violinists
Norwegian traditional musicians
Norwegian composers
Norwegian male composers
Heilo Music artists
Spellemannprisen winners
Musicians from Verdal
1981 births
Living people
21st-century violinists
21st-century Norwegian male musicians
Rune Grammofon artists